Gildred is a surname. Notable people with the surname include:

John Gildred (born 1970), American businessman
Theodore E. Gildred (1935–2019), American businessman and diplomat